Tabarabad (also Romanized as Tabarābād and Ţabarābād) is a village in Miyan Darband Rural District, in the Central District of Kermanshah County, Kermanshah Province, Iran. At the 2006 census, its population was 94, in 21 families.

References 

Populated places in Kermanshah County